Fire on the Floor is the eighth solo studio album by American singer-songwriter Beth Hart. It was released on October 14, 2016 in Europe, Australia, and New Zealand, and February 3, 2017 in the rest of the world.

Hart wrote and recorded the songs for Fire on the Floor before the songs for her previous album Better Than Home was mixed.  Hart recorded with some musicians she had not performed with before, such as Michael Landau and Waddy Wachtel on electric guitar, and they recorded sixteen songs in three days, although the mixing took much longer. Other artists performing on the album are Jim Cox on piano, Dean Parks on acoustic guitar, Brian Allen on bass, Rick Marotta on drums, and Ivan Neville on the Hammond B3.

The album was Produced by Oliver Leiber and recorded by Niko Bolas. It debuted at No. 1 on the Billboard Blues Albums Chart, becoming her sixth number one album overall.

Track listing

Charts

References

2016 albums
Beth Hart albums
Jazz albums by American artists